Robert J. Starks (born October 14, 1945) is an American politician. He served as a Republican member for the 34th, 36th and 118th district of the Florida House of Representatives.

Starks was born in Tampa, Florida, and attended the University of South Florida, where he earned a bachelor's degree in business administration. In 1986, Starks was elected for the 118th district of the Florida House of Representatives, succeeding Dexter Lehtinen. He served until 1988, when he was succeeded by Tom Easterly. In 1990 he was elected for the 36th district, succeeding Tom Drage. Starks was succeeded by Kim Shepard for the 36th district in 1992, when he was elected for the 34th district, succeeding Frank Stone and serving until 2000 when he was succeeded by David J. Mealor.

References 

1945 births
Living people
Politicians from Tampa, Florida
Republican Party members of the Florida House of Representatives
20th-century American politicians
University of South Florida alumni